Brad or Bradley Phillips may refer to:

 Brad Phillips (soccer) (born 1987), South African football player
 Brad Phillips (artist) (born 1974), Canadian painter
 Bradley Phillips (Wisconsin minister) (1818–1904), American minister and politician

See also
 Bradley Wright-Phillips (born 1985), English footballer